The First Battle of Saltville (October 2, 1864) was fought near the town of Saltville, Virginia, during the American Civil War. The battle over a significant Confederate saltworks in town was fought by both regular and Home Guard Confederate units against regular U.S. Army troops, which included two of the few black cavalry units of the United States Colored Troops. U.S. Army Brig. Gen. Stephen G. Burbridge, then commander of U.S. forces in the Commonwealth of Kentucky, led the U.S. Army troops.

Confederates murdered both black and white wounded soldiers after the battle, in what has been called the Saltville Massacre.

Saltville Massacre
The battle was a Confederate victory. It has become known primarily for the Confederate massacre afterward of white and black wounded U.S. Army troops. Both Confederate soldiers and irregular guerrilla forces under the notorious Champ Ferguson murdered white and black U.S. Army soldiers on the battlefield and later some wounded who were being treated at the field hospital set up at nearby Emory and Henry College. A U.S. Army surgeon reported that 5–7 black soldiers and Elza Smith, a white lieutenant, were murdered at the hospital. Ferguson was tried after the war in Nashville, Tennessee, for these and other non-military killings. He was found guilty and executed on October 29, 1865.

Confederate Brig. Gen. Felix Huston Robertson had bragged to another officer that "he had killed nearly all the Negroes." William C. Davis, in his book An Honorable Defeat. The Last Days of the Confederate Government (2001), says that Robertson personally "join(ed) in the act of villainy", although he escaped prosecution. When General Robert E. Lee learned of Robertson's conduct, he communicated to General John C. Breckinridge, Commander of the Department of East Tennessee and West Virginia, his dismay "that a general officer should have been guilty of the crime you mention" and instructed Breckinridge to "prefer charges against him and bring him to trial."

Estimates of the number of men massacred at Saltville vary, with most sources indicating around fifty casualties. Thomas Mays, in his book The Saltville Massacre (1995), argued that 46 U.S. Army soldiers were killed. An analysis of the National Archives records by Bryce Suderow, Phyllis Brown, and David Brown concluded that 45–50 members of the 5th and 6th U.S. Colored Cavalry (USCC) were murdered by Confederates. William Marvel had earlier analyzed the same records and concluded in 1991 that "Five black soldiers, wounded and helpless were definitely murdered at Saltville on October 3, and as many as seven more may have suffered the same fate there that day." The Confederates may have murdered as many as two dozen U.S. Army men.

Second battle
The Second Battle of Saltville took place two months later at Saltville.

Battlefield preservation
The Civil War Trust (a division of the American Battlefield Trust) and its partners have acquired and preserved  of the Saltville battlefields.

See also

Saltville Battlefields Historic District
Second Battle of Saltville
5th United States Colored Cavalry
Champ Ferguson, hanged in October 1865 on murder charges.
John C. Breckinridge, attempted to have Felix Huston Robertson tried for killing black soldiers.
Salt in the American Civil War
Camp Nelson Heritage National Monument

References

Further reading

 Davis, William C., and James I. Robertson. Virginia at War: 1862. Lexington: University Press of Kentucky, 2007.
 Duncan, Richard R. Lee's Endangered Left: The Civil War in Western Virginia. Baton Rouge: Louisiana State University Press, 1998.
 Glatthaar, Joseph T. Forged in Battle: The Civil War Alliance of Black Soldiers and White Officers. New York: The Free Press, 1990.
 Mays, Thomas. The Saltville Massacre, Abilene, Texas: State House Press, 1995
 Mosgrove, George Dallas. Kentucky Cavaliers in Dixie, Reminiscences of a Confederate Cavalryman, Louisville, KY: Courier-Journal Job Publishing Co., 1895; republished 1957 by Mc Cowart-Mercer Press, Jackson, TN; that version reprinted in 1999 by University of Nebraska Press.

External links
"Saltville, Virginia", Coverage by Harper's Weekly; continued here

Battles of the Western Theater of the American Civil War
Confederate victories of the American Civil War
African Americans in the American Civil War
Battle of Saltville I
Battle of Saltville I
Battles of the American Civil War in Virginia
Conflicts in 1864
1864 in Virginia
Confederate war crimes
October 1864 events